Steirastoma zischkai is a species of beetle in the family Cerambycidae. It was described by Prosen in 1958.

References

Acanthoderini
Beetles described in 1958